Vishweshwar Thool (1 July 1946 – 24 April 2014) was an Indian cricketer. He played one first-class match for Vidarbha in 1971/72.

References

External links
 

1946 births
2014 deaths
Indian cricketers
Vidarbha cricketers
Cricketers from Nagpur